Sexy Star (born August 4, 1999) is the ring name of a Mexican luchadora enmascarada (or masked professional wrestler). She is currently a freelancer, working for Lucha Libre AAA Worldwide as well as on the independent circuit. 

Sexy Star has also previously worked as La Hija de Gatubela and Picadura Letal. Her real name is not a matter of public record, as is often the case with masked wrestlers in Mexico where their private lives are kept a secret from the wrestling fans.

Professional wrestling career
La Hija de Gatubela was trained by Tapatío Jr., Black Shadow Jr., Príncipe Negro and Mr. Tempest and debuted in July 2016 in her hometown of Mexicali. After several years on the independent scene, she signed with Kaoz Lucha Libre in January 2021. In May of the same year, she debuted in Lucha Libre AAA Worldwide at their Rey de Reyes pay-per-view event under the ring name Sexy Star, which previously belonged to another wrestler of the same name. Her contract with AAA is not exclusive, and she continues to wrestle on the independent scene, including in the United States. In January 2022, Sexy Star won The Crash Women's Championship. At Triplemanía XXX in Monterrey in August of the same year, she challenged for the mixed titles alongside Komander, but lost to Sammy Guevara and Tay Conti. On February 5, 2023, at Rey de Reyes, she won the five-woman Reina de Reinas match.

Personal life
Sexy Star's mother wrestled under the name Gatubela, and her father wrestled under the name El Traidor. She is in a relationship with fellow luchador Septimo Dragón who primarily wrestles in the United States and Japan.

Championships and accomplishments
The Crash Lucha Libre
The Crash Women's Championship (1 time, current)
Kaoz Lucha Libre
Kaoz Women's Tag Team Championship (1 time, current) – with Black Widow
Lucha Libre AAA Worldwide
Reina de Reinas (2023)

Footnotes

References

External links
 

1999 births
Living people
Mexican female professional wrestlers
Masked wrestlers
Unidentified wrestlers
Sportspeople from Mexicali
Professional wrestlers from Baja California
21st-century professional wrestlers